Eric De La Cerda (born June 25, 2001) is an American soccer player who currently plays for San Jose Earthquakes II in MLS Next Pro.

Career
De La Cerda has been part of the San Jose Earthquakes academy since 2015. In 2020, he signed a USL academy contract with USL Championship side Reno 1868. He made his professional debut on July 29, 2020, starting in a 4–1 win over Portland Timbers 2.

On March 11, 2022, it was announced De La Cerda would join San Jose Earthquakes II in the MLS Next Pro.

References

External links
USL Championship bio

2001 births
Living people
American soccer players
Association football goalkeepers
MLS Next Pro players
Reno 1868 FC players
Soccer players from California
USL Championship players
People from Gilroy, California
Sportspeople from Santa Clara County, California